Judith Anne Nunn (AM) (born 13 April 1945), (also published under the pen name of Judy Bernard-Waite), is an Australian author, of both adult and children's fiction titles. she has collaborated with writers Patricia Bernard and Fiona Waite. 

Nunn is a former theatre and television actress and radio and television screenwriter go nearly 50 years, best known for her 15 year tenure in TV  soap opera Home and Away as original character Ailsa Hogan.

Nunn was awarded a Member of the Order of Australia in the 2015 Australia Day Honours for her service to the performing arts as a scriptwriter and actor of stage and screen, and to literature as an author.

Acting career

Nunn was for many years as a leading stage actress, starting in 1964 

Her breakout television role was as in the risque soap opera The Box, as scheming  bisexual reporter Vicki Stafford. Her character became a popular cult figure in the series and she continued Nunn in the role for the show's entire 1974–77 three year run and reprised in the feature film version in 1975. 

In 1979 she briefly played Joyce Martin in the Australian TV series Prisoner and after that as Dr. Irene Fisher in television serial Sons and Daughters from 1984 until 1986.

Best known for her role as original character Ailsa Stewart in the soap opera Home and Away, from 1988 until the character was killed off in 2000 after deciding to leave the series to devote more time with novels, is probably Nunn's most famous role. In 2002 she returned in a guest role playing the same character - it transpired this was an hallucination of her former on-screen husband, Alf Stewart, caused by a brain tumour.

Personal life 

Nunn attended Presbyterian Ladies' College, Perth. She married her husband, actor and writer and former Tasmanian & Royal Hong Kong police officer Bruce Venables, the same week in which she filmed her character Ailsa's marriage to Alf (Ray Meagher) in Home and Away in 1988. Formerly long-time residents of Bondi, New South Wales, Nunn and her husband now reside on the Central Coast, New South Wales.

Screenwriting

Nunn is a screenwriter of radio and television and author. She has written scripts for programmes Neighbours and Possession.

Literary career

In the 1980s she decided to turn her hand to prose. The result was two adventure novels for children, Eye in the Storm and Eye in the City, which remain popular in Australia and Europe.

Embarking on adult fiction in the early 1990s, Judy's three novels, The Glitter Game, Centre Stage and Araluen, set respectively in the worlds of television, theatre and film, became bestsellers. A specialist in Australian period fiction, other books she has written include Kal, Beneath the Southern Cross, Territory, Pacific, Heritage, Floodtide, Maralinga, Tiger Men  in 2011, Elianne in 2013 and Spirits of the Ghan in 2015.

Film

Television

Bibliography

Children’s fiction

The Riddle of the Trumpalar (1981, as Judy Bernard-Waite) with Patricia Bernard and Fiona Waite
Challenge of the Trumpalar (1986, as Judy Bernard-Waite) with Patricia Bernard and Fiona Waite
Eye in the Storm (1988)
Eye in the City (1991)

Adult fiction

References

Sources

External links
 Official website
 Judy Nunn at Penguin Random House Australia
 
 Judy Nunn at Scholastic Australia

1945 births
Living people
Australian screenwriters
People educated at Presbyterian Ladies' College, Perth
Australian women novelists
Members of the Order of Australia
Australian film actresses
Australian soap opera actresses
Australian stage actresses
Australian voice actresses
20th-century Australian actresses
21st-century Australian actresses
20th-century pseudonymous writers
Pseudonymous women writers